This is a list of all venues which have hosted at least one Big Bash League match.

Primary venues

Secondary venues

Former venues

References 

Venues
Venues
Cricket grounds in Australia
Cricket grounds by competition
Lists of cricket grounds